The finals and the qualifying heats of the Women's 100 metres Backstroke event at the 1997 FINA Short Course World Championships were held on the second day of the competition, on Friday 18 April 1997 in Gothenburg, Sweden.

Finals

See also
1996 Women's Olympic Games 100m Backstroke
1997 Women's European LC Championships 100m Backstroke

References
 Results

B
1997 in women's swimming